Norberto Alejandro Briasco Balekian (born 29 February 1996) is a professional footballer who plays as a forward for Argentine Primera División club Boca Juniors and the Armenia national football team. Born in Argentina to an Armenian Argentine mother, he has represented Armenia internationally since 2018.

Early life
Briasco was born in Buenos Aires, Argentina. He also holds Armenian citizenship through his mother, surnamed Balekian, whose parents are Armenian. His grandfather helped him learn the Armenian language, with Briasco stating that "it is quite complicated, but I wrote down the basics to study [the language]".. His maternal greatgrandparents survived and escaped the Armenian Genocide.

Club career
On 27 August 2016, Briasco made his debut in a 1–0 away defeat against Godoy Cruz after coming on as a substitute at the 75th minute in place of Mauro Bogado. On 11 March 2017, scored his first official goal for Huracán senior squad, that gave his team the final 1–0 win away at San Martín de San Juan.

On 3 March 2017, he made his continental club debut at the 2017 Copa Sudamericana, in a 3–0 away defeat against Deportivo Anzoategui, away in Venezuela. Norberto scored his first continental goal in the return game in Buenos Aires, a 4–0 win that saw Huracán go through to the next round.

On 17 June 2021, Briasco signed a four year contract with Boca Juniors.

International career
On 7 March 2018, Briasco received his first call-up for the Armenia national team for the friendly matches against Estonia and Lithuania. He made his international debut in a 0–0 friendly draw with Estonia on 24 March 2018.

Honours
Boca Juniors
Primera División: 2022
Copa Argentina: 2019–20
Copa de la Liga Profesional: 2022
Supercopa Argentina: 2022

References

External links
 
 

1996 births
Living people
Armenian footballers
Argentine footballers
Argentine people of Armenian descent
Citizens of Armenia through descent
Armenian people of Argentine descent
Sportspeople of Argentine descent
Association football wingers
Club Atlético Huracán footballers
Argentine Primera División players
Armenia international footballers
Footballers from Buenos Aires